Blood Libels is the third full-length album by French black metal band Antaeus.

Track listing
 Rot - 5:36
 Cyklik Torture - 3:40 (Lyrics: Nornagest)
 Control and Abuse - 5:34
 Colliding in Ashes - 5:10
 Words as Weapons - 6:27
 Here Is Punishment - 3:29
 Gates to the Outside - 3:27 (Lyrics: Drakh)
 Blood Libels - 9:39

Album notes
As noted on the album's Discogs page:
Track 1 is depicted on the back cover as a symbol resembling the alchemical symbol for putrefaction. In the booklet it is denoted by the same symbol together with the title "Everything Great Is Built Upon Sorrow". The song is otherwise (as likely is the symbol) referred to as "Rot" by the band. 
Track 2 is titled "Cyklic Torture" on back cover, in booklet it appears as entered. 
Track 7 is titled as "The Walking" in booklet. 
Track 8.1 duration refers to entire track 8. 
Track 8.2, the outro of the album at the end of track 8, consists of a cover of "Sono L'Antechristo" by Diamanda Galás, and is cross-faded in from "Blood Libels" from 6:18 on. It is unmentioned in the track listing on the release, but referred to in the credit prints.

Personnel
LSK - bass
Zvn - drums
Servvs - guitar
Set - guitar 
MkM - vocals
Amduscias - backing vocals (track 8)
Arkdaemon - backing vocals (track 8)
Bst - backing vocals (track 8)

References

Antaeus (band) albums
2006 albums